Korshunovka is a rural locality (a village) in Narodnenskoye Rural Settlement, Ternovsky District, Voronezh Oblast, Russia. The population was 89 as of 2010. There are 2 streets.

Geography 
Korshunovka is located 28 km southeast of Ternovka (the district's administrative centre) by road. Alexandrovka is the nearest rural locality.

References 

Rural localities in Ternovsky District